G antigen family D member 2 is a protein that in humans is encoded by the XAGE1D gene.

This gene is a member of the XAGE subfamily, which belongs to the GAGE family. The GAGE genes are expressed in a variety of tumors and in some fetal and reproductive tissues. This gene is strongly expressed in Ewing's sarcoma, alveolar rhabdomyosarcoma and normal testis. The protein encoded by this gene contains a nuclear localization signal and shares a sequence similarity with other GAGE/PAGE proteins. Because of the expression pattern and the sequence similarity, this protein also belongs to a family of CT (cancer-testis) antigens. Alternative splicing of this gene generates 3 transcript variants, and one of which includes 2 transcripts generated from alternate transcription initiation sites.

References

Further reading